The Herefordshire Deanery is a Roman Catholic deanery in the Archdiocese of Cardiff that covers several churches in Hereford and the surrounding area.

The dean of Hereford is centred at Belmont Abbey.

Churches 

 Belmont Abbey, Hereford
 Our Lady Queen of Martyrs, Hereford - served from Belmont Abbey
 St Francis Xavier, Hereford
 The Most Holy Trinity, Ledbury
 St Ethelbert, Leominster
 St Joseph, Bromyard - served from Leominster
 St Thomas of Hereford, Weobley
 St Bede, Kington - served from Weobley

Gallery

References

External links
 The Roman Catholic Deanery of Hereford
 Belmont Abbey Parish site
 St Joseph Church site
 St Francis Xavier Church site
 Our Lady Queen of Martyrs Church site
 St Ethelbert Church site
 St Thomas of Hereford Parish site
 The Most Holy Trinity Church site

Roman Catholic Deaneries in the Archdiocese of Cardiff